Yawajaba Island, often referred to as Montgomery Island, is an island off the Kimberley coast of Western Australia.

It is at the southern end of the Camden Sound and is surrounded by Montgomery Reef.

Composed of sand and mangroves, it is the largest island within the Montgomery reef system.

References

Islands of the Kimberley (Western Australia)